Racing Club Heemstede (RCH) is an association football club from Heemstede, Netherlands. It was founded on 25 February 1911 and won the national title in 1923 and 1953.
Until 1932 the club played in Haarlem and until 1965 the official name was Racing Club Haarlem.

Honours 
Dutch National Football League
Winners 1922–23, 1952–53
Dutch Football Cup
Winners 1917–18, 1927–28

Associated people

Chief coach 
 1922–1924: Bill Julian
 1946–1947: Bob Meacock
 1947–1959: Les Talbot
 1959–1961: Kick Smit
 1961–1962: Thim van der Laan
 1962–1965: Meg de Jongh
 1965–1967: Tinus van der Pijl
 1967–1967: Piet Dubbelman
 1967–1970: Piet Peeman
 1970: Les Talbot (interim)
 1970–1971: Ben Tap

Top scorer 
 1955–56: Maup Kruijer (17)
 1961–62: Ab Koning (7)
 1962–63: Arie van den Berg (18)
 1963–64: Ulrich Maslo (13)
 1964–65: Ulrich Maslo (14)
 1965–66: Jan Fransz (10)
 1970–71: Piet van den Berg (13)

References

External links
Official website

Football clubs in the Netherlands
Football clubs in North Holland
Association football clubs established in 1911
1911 establishments in the Netherlands
Sport in Heemstede
Racing Club Heemstede